Loren Gerome Brown, nicknamed "Totch", (March 12, 1920 – May 8, 1996) was an author of historical accounts and first-hand descriptions of life in the Florida Everglades. He wrote Totch, A Life in the Everglades. The book describes Floridians survived off the land from the late 1800s until recent times.

His real name and nickname were given to him by a family friend who was the caretaker for the Indiana family's winter home in Florida. At age 13 he quit school to work full-time during the Great Depression. He was a commercial fisherman on the Gulf of Mexico and Florida Bay, hunted gators, and was an infantryman at the Battle of the Bulge during World War II, winning a Bronze Star. He was also a drug runner and did time in prison for tax evasion. His family lives in Chokoloskee.

"While life in the Everglades was no picnic, the privilege of living a free life that close to nature was worth all the hardships that came with it: coping with alligators, panthers, and rattlesnakes on muddy lands filled with poison ivy, spiders, and mosquitoes so thick you could rake `em off your brow by the handful."

References

External links
 Videoprojects.tv
 Videoprojects.tv

1920 births
1996 deaths
Place of birth missing
20th-century American writers
20th-century American male writers
United States Army personnel of World War II